HMS Hasty was an H-class destroyer built for the Royal Navy during the mid-1930s. She was assigned to the Mediterranean Fleet until the beginning of World War II. The ship transferred to Freetown, Sierra Leone, in October 1939 to hunt for German commerce raiders in the South Atlantic with Force K. Hasty returned to the British Isles in early 1940 and covered the evacuation of Allied troops from Namsos in early May 1940 during the Norwegian Campaign. She was transferred back to the Mediterranean Fleet shortly afterwards and participated in the Battle of Calabria and the Battle of Cape Spada in July 1940. The ship took part in the Battle of Cape Matapan in March and evacuated British and Australian troops from both Greece and Crete in April and May. In June, Hasty participated in the Syria-Lebanon Campaign and was escorting convoys and the larger ships of the Mediterranean Fleet for the next year. During the Second Battle of Sirte in March 1942 she defended a convoy from an Italian battleship and several cruisers. While covering another convoy from Alexandria to Malta in June 1942 during Operation Vigorous, Hasty was torpedoed by a German motor torpedo boat and was so badly damaged that she had to be scuttled.

Description
Steam for the turbines was provided by three Admiralty 3-drum water-tube boilers. The ship's complement was 137 officers and men in peacetime, but this increased to 146 in wartime.

The ship mounted four 45-calibre 4.7-inch (120 mm) Mark IX guns in single mounts. For anti-aircraft (AA) defence, Hasty had two quadruple Mark I mounts for the 0.5 inch Vickers Mark III machine gun. She was fitted with two above-water quadruple torpedo tube mounts for  torpedoes. One depth charge rail and two throwers were fitted; 20 depth charges were originally carried, but this increased to 35 shortly after the war began.

Beginning in mid-1940, the ship's anti-aircraft armament was increased, although when exactly the modifications were made is not known. The rear set of torpedo tubes was replaced by a  AA gun and the quadruple .50-calibre Vickers mounts were replaced by  Oerlikon autocannon. Two more Oerlikon guns were also added in the forward superstructure.

Service
Hasty was laid down by William Denny and Brothers, of Dumbarton in Scotland on 15 April 1935, launched on 5 May 1936 and completed on 11 November 1936. Excluding government-furnished equipment like the armament, the ship cost £248,611. She was assigned to the 2nd Destroyer Flotilla of the Mediterranean Fleet upon commissioning. Hasty was refitted in Devonport Dockyard in June–July 1939 and she returned to the Mediterranean afterwards.

Hasty escorted convoys between Port Said, Egypt and Gibraltar immediately after World War II began in September. They refuelled in Rio de Janeiro, Brazil, before proceeding to the estuary of the River Plate in case the damaged German pocket battleship  attempted to escape from Montevideo, Uruguay, where she had taken refuge after losing the Battle of the River Plate. Hasty was ordered to the UK in January 1940 to refit and captured the German blockade runner SS Morea in the North Atlantic on 12 February en route.

The ship was assigned to the Home Fleet after completing her refit in March. Together with the destroyer , Hasty escorted the destroyer  into Newcastle upon Tyne on 19–20 March after the latter ship had collided with a Swedish merchant ship in the North Sea. Weather damage prevented the ship from participating in the early stages of the Norwegian Campaign, but she escorted the aircraft carriers  and Ark Royal from 21 April as their aircraft attacked German targets in Norway. Hasty was one of Gloriouss escorts when the carrier returned to Scapa Flow to refuel on 27 April. Two days later, the ship escorted the convoy that evacuated British and French troops from Namsos in early May.

On 9 July Hasty participated in the Battle of Calabria as an escort for the heavy ships of Force C and unsuccessfully engaged Italian destroyers and suffered no damage. During the Battle of Cape Spada on 19 July, the ship escorted Australian light cruiser  and rescued some 525 survivors from the  together with the other escorting destroyers. The ship escorted the carrier  during the Battle of Taranto on the night of 11/12 November.

The ship participated in Operation Excess in January 1941, during which she escorted a convoy and then escorted the battleship  from Souda Bay, Crete, to Alexandria. In late February, the ship evacuated British commandos from the island of Kastelorizo, off the coast of Turkey, in the Italian Dodecanese. The commandos had defeated the small garrison in Operation Abstention, but the Italians were able to land troops on the island over the next several days and overwhelm the British forces. During the Battle of Cape Matapan on 28/29 March, Hasty escorted the four light cruisers of Force B, but was not seriously engaged during the battle. On 15 April the ship and the light cruiser  bombarded Italian positions between Bardia and Fort Capuzzo. In mid-April she escorted the fast transport  and three battleships from Alexandria to Malta, before going on to escort the battleships as they bombarded Tripoli on 20 April. After refuelling in Alexandria on 23 April, Hasty sailed for Greece to begin evacuating British and Australian troops from the beaches. On 8 May, the ship again escorted the capital ships of the Mediterranean Fleet as they covered another convoy from Alexandria to Malta. The ship evacuated British and Commonwealth troops from Crete in late May.

Hasty bombarded Vichy French positions in Lebanon on 4 July during the Syria-Lebanon Campaign, and then spent most of the rest of the year escorting convoys to Tobruk. While escorting a convoy, Hasty and her sister, sank  on 23 December north of Sollum. In January 1942, the ship escorted Convoys MF.3 and MF.4 from Alexandria to Malta, but was switched to the covering force for Convoy MF.5 in mid-February. Hasty was torpedoed by the German E-Boat S-55 under the command of Oberleutnant zur See Horst Weber as she covered a large convoy to Malta during Operation Vigorous, killing 13 men. The torpedo blew off most of the bow structure and both boiler rooms started to flood. Hotspur took off her crew and scuttled her with a torpedo during the morning of 15 June 1942.

Notes

Footnotes

References
 
 
 
 

 

G and H-class destroyers of the Royal Navy
Ships built on the River Clyde
1936 ships
World War II destroyers of the United Kingdom
World War II shipwrecks in the Mediterranean Sea
Maritime incidents in June 1942